Podosharikha is a rural locality (a village) in Razinskoye Rural Settlement, Kharovsky District, Vologda Oblast, Russia. The population was 19 as of 2002.

Geography 
Podosharikha is located 46 km north of Kharovsk (the district's administrative centre) by road. Gribtsovskaya is the nearest rural locality.

References 

Rural localities in Kharovsky District